Centenary University is a private liberal arts university in Hackettstown, New Jersey. Founded as a preparatory school by the Newark Conference of the United Methodist Church in 1867, Centenary evolved into a Junior College for women and later a coeducational four year University offering undergraduate and Master's level graduate programs.

Situated in suburban Warren County, New Jersey, 52 miles west of New York City, 35 miles southeast of the Delaware Water Gap National Recreation Area, and 26 miles northeast of Easton, Pennsylvania in the Lehigh Valley, the school's main campus is identifiable by the Old Main building, listed on the National Register of Historic Places.

History

Centenary was founded as the Centenary Collegiate Institute (CCI) by what was then known as the Methodist Episcopal Church in 1867. The name was chosen to commemorate the centennial of Methodism in the United States. It was built at a cost of $200,000. George H. Whitney, D.D., was president from 1869 to 1895.

Beginning as a coeducational preparatory school, CCI became a girls only institution in 1910. In 1940, it became a junior college: Centenary Junior College. It would subsequently become Centenary College for Women in 1956 before becoming Centenary College in 1976, a four-year college for girls offering associate and bachelor's degrees with men allowed to pursue degrees only at night courses. In 1988, men were allowed to attend full time. In 1995, master's degree programs were introduced. In 2016, Centenary College was granted University status by the New Jersey Secretary of Higher Education.
In 1886, a 19 year old kitchen worker named Tillie Smith was "outraged" and murdered in a field just off campus. A janitor at CCI named James Titus was convicted of the crime based on circumstantial evidence strongly influenced by yellow journalism. Authors and  historians generally consider this to be a false conviction but debate over the facts continue perennially through dark tourism ghost tours, theatrical performances, books and Weird NJ magazine articles.

On Halloween night, 1899, the original five-story CCI building burned to the ground in a fire. The Seay Administration Building, also called Old Main, was designed by architect Oscar Schutte Teale in a Renaissance Beaux Arts style and built on the ruins of the original structure in 1901.

In 1957, a student run FM college radio station WNTI began broadcasting on campus. Eventually becoming an NPR affiliate serving the regional community with an adult album rock format, the FM transmitter was sold to University of Pennsylvania based WXPN in 2015. As of 2020, a student run internet radio station continues to operate at WNTI.org.

The Centenary Stage Company, a professional Equity theater, has been operating on campus since 1985. In 1992, a "Women's Playwright Series" development program offers grants, workshops, prizes and world premieres for the underserved voice of women in theater. Centenary also offers an intensive musical theater program for intermediate and advanced young performers.

In 1999, Centenary founded the Center for Adult and Professional Studies program. In 2011, the program was renamed the School of Professional Studies.

Enrollment
In 2019, Centenary reported enrollment of 1,119  students. Centenary was the first college in the State of New Jersey to require service education as a condition of graduation.

Accreditation
Centenary University is accredited by the Middle States Commission on Higher Education and approved by the University Senate of the United Methodist Church. Some programs at Centenary are accredited by the International Assembly for Collegiate Business Education, Council for the Accreditation of Educator Preparation, Council on Social Work Education, or International Assembly for Collegiate Business Education.

Main campus and learning centers
Centenary University Main campus is located in Hackettstown, New Jersey. The Centenary Equestrian Center located in Long Valley provides riding and education facilities for its Equine Studies Department. The college also operates two satellite learning centers located in Parsippany and Edison, New Jersey to service its adult student programs.

Hackettstown Campus 
The main campus of Centenary University is home to most of the school's academic, administrative, athletic and collegiate activities, as well as housing for its undergraduate students. It consists of ten main buildings and eight residence buildings. It was added to the National Register of Historic Places on June 13, 1997, for its significance in architecture.

Buildings

 Seay Building – Classrooms,  Whitney Chapel, Student Activities Center: Career Development Center, #theVibe, Student Life Suite; the LittleTheater, Main College Offices: Admissions, Alumni Affairs, Bursar, Campus Life, Advancement, Marketing & Communications, Financial Aid, Health Services, Human Resources, Information Technology, President's Office
 Brotherton Hall – Professor offices, Classrooms
Ferry Building – Classrooms and small music hall
Harris & Betts Smith Learning Center – Academic Success Center, Student Veterans Organization, Disabilities Services Office, Classrooms
 Littell Technology Center – Classrooms, Graphics Department, ENACTUS office
 Lackland Center – Classrooms, Dance Studio, Dining Center, Sitnik Theatre, Edith Kutz Black Box Theater, TV studio, WNTI Radio Studio
Reeves Gymnasium – Athletics Department, Gym, Pool, Weight Room, Wrestling Center
 Smith Hall – International Studies Department
 Taylor Memorial Library – Library, Print Shop
 Trevorrow – Science and Fine Art Building; Classrooms, Labs, Fashion Department, Science Department

Residence halls
 Anderson – Co-ed (Co-ed floors, male only and female only rooms)
 Bennett-Smith – Apartments (Co-ed floors, male or female only suites)
 Founders – Apartments (Co-ed floors, choice of male only, female only, or Co-ed suites)
 Lotte – Co-ed (male only and female only rooms)
 Reeves –  Co-ed Freshmen only (1st and 2nd floor male only and female only rooms, 3rd floor female only)
 Smith – Co-ed  International & Freshmen only (1st floor international, 2nd and 3rd floor male only and female only rooms)
 Van Winkle – Co-ed (Male only and female only rooms)
 Washabaugh – Co-ed (Male and female only floors: 1st floor: male, 2nd floor: female)

Equestrian Center 
The Equestrian Center is located in Long Valley, New Jersey. It consists of several large paddocks, an outdoor eventing course, two indoor arenas and one outdoor arena.

In 2007 and 2012 Centenary Equestrian Center hosted the American National Riding Commission Championships, Intercollegiate Horse Show Association Zone Finals, and the Intercollegiate Dressage Association Championships.

Parsippany Center 
The Parsippany campus is home to Centenary's School of Professional Studies faculty and staff. This location boasts a small cafe, offices for staff, a student computer lab, a student workroom, and 13 classrooms operating with a broadband WiFi network. Classes take place in the evening for the benefit of working professionals.

Edison Center 
The Edison office serves as a satellite location for the Centenary School of Professional Studies. This location consists of six classrooms, two offices, a small conference room, a small dinette, a student work room, and a wireless broadband network. The building complex hosts a cafeteria and ample parking.

Athletics

Centenary University teams participate in eight NCAA Division III intercollegiate sports. The Cyclones joined the Colonial States Athletic Conference for the 2007–08 season, after having been a member of the Skyline Conference. Men's sports include baseball, basketball, cross country, equestrian, golf, lacrosse, soccer and wrestling; while women's sports include basketball, cross country, equestrian, lacrosse, soccer, softball and volleyball. Students enrolled in the college's Equine programs may participate in competitions through intercollegiate organizations such as the Intercollegiate Horse Show Association, the Intercollegiate Dressage Association, or with the Hunter/Jumper's Club.

Noted athletic achievements
In 2009 Centenary's Intercollegiate Horse Show Association team won the National Championships in Murfreesboro, Tennessee. Lindsay Clark, a Centenary Student, also won the USEF/Cacchione Cup.

The 2010 women's soccer team won the CSAC Championship, earning them an automatic bid to the NCAA Tournament. The 2013 and 2016 men's soccer teams replicated this feat.

Notable alumni and staff
Bette Cooper (1920-2017), Miss America 1937.
Jonathan Townley Crane (1819-1880), clergyman, author, abolitionist, co-founder of the school.
William Howe Crane (1854-1926), lawyer.
Mike Hall (born 1989), bassist.
 Debbie Harry (born 1945), lead singer of Blondie.
 Cole Kimball (born 1985), pitcher drafted by the Washington Nationals.
 Carol McCain (born 1937), former wife of U.S. Senator and former 2008 Republican Presidential Candidate John McCain.
 Gail Phoebus (born 1950), politician who has represented the 24th Legislative District in the New Jersey General Assembly since 2015.

References

External links

 
History & Traditions | Centenary University ™
WNTI.org | The Sound of Centenary
Centenary Stage Company

 
Hackettstown, New Jersey
Universities and colleges in Warren County, New Jersey
Educational institutions established in 1867
National Register of Historic Places in Warren County, New Jersey
New Jersey Register of Historic Places
1867 establishments in New Jersey
Private universities and colleges in New Jersey